"Disco Tits" (stylized in all lowercase on the tracklist) is a song by Swedish singer-songwriter Tove Lo. It was released on 7 September 2017 as the lead single from Lo's third studio album, Blue Lips, and it was her first release after the short film Fire Fade. The song was released on Spotify a week prior to the song's official release, but was removed soon after.

Composition 
"Disco Tits" is a disco- and house-inflected electroclash and dance-pop song. The song moves at a tempo of 110 beats per minute. According to the singer, "Disco Tits" is about "losing yourself with your new found love."

Critical reception 
Tom Breihan of Stereogum praised the song's "sexy-deadpan delivery and its chilly throb." Hilary Hughes of MTV wrote that the song "is a banger to blast as you're getting hyped for a night out, and an anthem to keep you on the dance floor once you get there all rolled up in a single song." She additionally wrote that "it's definitely not for the faint of heart." Mike Wass of Idolator wrote that the song "retreats to the druggy dance-pop of Queen of the Clouds." David Sikorski of Ear Milk called the song "a sweat dripping retro club banger that we just can't get enough of." Media site Uproxx described the song as "a disco-inspired take on a modern club banger that has some Robyn vibes."

Year-end lists

Music video 
The song's music video, directed by Tim Erem, premiered on 5 October 2017, via Lo's Vevo channel. The video begins with Tove Lo on a family-friendly talk show with a puppet. When being asked to describe the name "Lady Wood" she says a banned word. She then flirts with the puppet and invites him on a raunchy road trip filled with drugs and sex. The video was described by media as "titillating" and "riotous". Chris Malone Méndez of Billboard analyzed the music video by saying "while she [Lo] and the Muppet engage in foreplay, a handsome Swedish-looking man begins to take the place of the Muppet, presumably as a metaphor for her escapades (and sexcapades) with human men". As of 9 October 2022, the clip has over 13,000,000 views on YouTube.

Track listing
Digital download
 "Disco Tits" – 3:44

Remixes
 "Disco Tits" (Oliver Remix) – 4:23
 "Disco Tits" (Beatanger Remix) – 6:30
 "Disco Tits" (KREAM Remix) – 2:59

Remixes (Part II)
 "Disco Tits" (Chris Lake Remix) – 5:02
 "Disco Tits" (LENNO Remix) – 4:02
 "Disco Tits" (MK Remix) – 5:02

Personnel
Taken from Tidal.
 Tove Lo – lead vocals, songwriting
 Jakob Jerlström – songwriting, production
 Ludvig Söderberg – songwriting, production
 Chris Gehringer – mastering engineer
 John Hanes – assistant mixer
 Serban Ghenea – mixer
 Fat Max Gsus – additional vocals

Charts

Sales

|-
!scope="row"|United States
|
|5,498
|}

Release history

References

2017 singles
2017 songs
Music videos featuring puppetry
Republic Records singles
Songs written by Tove Lo
Tove Lo songs
Songs written by Ludvig Söderberg
Songs written by Jakob Jerlström
Songs about drugs
Songs about parties